Citrine may refer to:

 Citrine (colour), a shade of yellow
 Citrine quartz, a yellow variety of quartz
 Citrine (protein), a type of yellow fluorescent protein
 Citrine (EP), a 2016 album by Hayley Kiyoko
 Citrine (programming language), a programming language for Unix-like operating systems
 Citrine, a commonly-used informal name for ABC of Chairmanship by Walter Citrine

People 
 Walter Citrine, 1st Baron Citrine (1887–1983), British trade unionist and politician
 Baron Citrine, the hereditary title held by Walter Citrine

Fictional characters 
 Charlie Citrine, a character in the book Humboldt's Gift, by Saul Bellow
 Citrine (Xenosaga), a character in the Xenosaga series of video games

See also 
 Citrin, a protein